Zulkarnain Karim (died 13 November 2019) was an Indonesian politician who served as a member of the Regional Representative Council.

References

Date of birth missing
2019 deaths
Indonesian politicians
Place of birth missing